Erkki-Sven Tüür (born 16 October 1959) is an Estonian composer.

Life and career
Tüür was born in Kärdla on the Estonian island of Hiiumaa. He studied flute and percussion at the Tallinn Music School from 1976 to 1980 and composition with Jaan Rääts at the Tallinn Academy of Music and privately with Lepo Sumera from 1980 to 1984. From 1979 to 1984 he headed the rock group In Spe, which quickly became one of the most popular in Estonia.

Tüür left In Spe to concentrate on composition, and with the advent of perestroika soon found an audience in the west. The Helsinki Philharmonic, the Hilliard Ensemble, the Stockholm Saxophone Quartet and the City of Birmingham Symphony Orchestra are among those who have commissioned works from him. He was awarded the Cultural Prize of Estonia in 1991 and 1996 and the Baltic Assembly Prize for Literature, the Arts and Science in 1998.

His Concerto for Viola and Orchestra, entitled "Illuminatio", was premiered by violist Lars Anders Tomter and South Jutland Symphony Orchestra in October 2008.

Selected works
Tüür's works are published by Edition Peters, Henry Litolff's Verlag, Fennica Gehrman (owner of the Warner/Chappell Music Finland and Edition Fazer's serious music catalogues), Sovetsky Kompozitor, Antes Edition and Eres Edition.

Stage
 Wallenberg, Opera in 2 acts (2001); libretto by Lutz Hübner

Symphonies
 Symphony No. 1 (1984)
 Symphony No. 2 (1987)
 Symphony No. 3 (1997)
 Magma, Symphony No. 4 in one movement for solo percussion and orchestra (2002) (also see under Concertante)
 Symphony No. 5 for electric guitar, orchestra and big band (2004)
 Symphony No. 6 "Strata" in one movement (2007)
 Symphony No. 7 "Pietas" for mixed chorus and orchestra (2009)
 Symphony No. 8 (2010)
 Symphony No. 9 "Mythos" (2017)

Orchestral
 Insula Deserta for string orchestra (1989)
 Searching for Roots (Hommage a Sibelius) (1990)
 Zeitraum (1992)
 Architectonics VI for chamber orchestra (1992) (also see under Architectonics)
 Show (Action – Passion – Illusion) for string orchestra (1993)
   Action
   Passion
   Illusion
 Crystallisatio for chamber orchestra (1995)
 Lighthouse for string orchestra (1997)
 Exodus (1999)
 Aditus: In memoriam Lepo Sumera (2001–2002)
 Aqua for string orchestra (2003)
 Rada ja jäljed (The Path and the Traces) for string orchestra (2005)
 Flamma for string orchestra (2011)
 De Profundis for orchestra (2013)
 Le poids des vies non vécues for orchestra (2013)
 Tormiloits / Incantation of Tempest for orchestra (2014)
 L'ombra della croce (Dedicated to Manfred Eicher) for string orchestra (2014)
 Sow the Wind... for orchestra (2015)
 Phantasma for orchestra (2018)

Concertante
 Concerto for cello and orchestra (1996)
 Concerto for violin and orchestra (1999)
 Ardor, Concerto for marimba and orchestra (2001)
 Magma, Symphony No. 4 in one movement for solo percussion and orchestra (2002)
 Concerto for bassoon and orchestra (2003)
 Noesis, Concerto for violin, clarinet and orchestra (2005)
 Concerto for piano and orchestra (2006)
 Whistles and Whispers from Uluru for recorder and string orchestra (2007)
 Prophecy for accordion and orchestra (2007)
 Illuminatio, Concerto for viola and orchestra (2008)
 Peregrinus Ecstaticus, Concerto for clarinet and orchestra (2013)
 Solastalgia for piccolo flute and orchestra (2016)
Angel's Share, Concerto no. 2 for violin and orchestra (2017)

Architectonics
 Architectonics I for woodwind quintet (1984)
 Architectonics II for clarinet, cello and piano (1986)
 Architectonics III "Postmetaminimal Dream" for flute, alto flute, clarinet, bass clarinet, 2 pianos, synthesizer, percussion (2 players), violin and cello (1990)
 Architectonics IV "Per Cadenza ad Metasimplicity" for violin (or electric violin), bassoon, baritone saxophone and piano (or synthesizer) (1990)
 Architectonics V for electric guitar and amplified piano (1991)
 Architectonics VI for chamber orchestra (1992)
 Architectonics VII for flute, cello and harpsichord (or flute, bass clarinet and piano) (1992)

Chamber music
 Graafiline leht (Prints) for flute and harp (1985)
 String Quartet "In memoriam Urmas Kibuspuu" (1985)
 Sisemonoloog (Inner Monologue) for flute solo (1986)
 Dedication for cello and piano (1990)
 Dick ja Toff imedemaal (Dick and Toff in Wonderland) for flute and tuba (or bass clarinet) (1991)
 Kaljukitse märgi all (The Tropic of Capricorn) for flute, clarinet, vibraphone, violin, electric guitar (2nd electric guitar ad libitum) and MIDI electronics (1991)
 Miraaž (Mirage) for electronics (1991)
 Spiel for cello and guitar (1992)
 Drama for flute (or vibraphone), violin and guitar (1994)
 Spectrum II for organ, trumpet and percussion ad libitum (1994)
 Conversio for violin and piano (1994)
 Lamentatio for 4 saxophones (1995)
 Mängu võlu (The Glamour of the Game) for double bass, live electronics and MIDI percussion (1995)
 Symbiosis for violin and double bass (1996)
 Motus I for percussion (1998)
 Motus II for percussion (4 players) (1998)
 Fata Morgana for violin, cello and piano (2002)
 Sisemonoloog II (Inner Monologue II) for flute and electronics
 Oxymoron (Music for Tirol) for chamber ensemble and live electronics (2003)
 Spectrum IV for cello and organ (2004)
 Confession for violin solo (2007)
 Synergie for violin and cello (2010)
 String Quartet No. 2 "Lost Prayers" (2012)

Organ
 Spectrum I (1989)
 Spectrum III (1999)

Piano
 Kristiinale (To Kristiina) (1981, 1995)
 Sonatina for 2 pianos (1984)
 Piano Sonata (1985)
 Mõeldes Hiiumaast (Hiiumaa; Souvenir of Hiiumaa) (1992)
 Ülekanne (Transmission) for 6 pianos (1996)
 Short Meeting of Dark and Light (2003)
 Mida nägin mäetipule jõudes (What I Saw from the Top of the Mountain), Music for Children (2003)

Vocal
 Excitatio ad Contemplandum for alto, 2 tenors, baritone (or mixed chorus) and organ (1996)
 Questions... for countertenor, 2 tenors, baritone and string orchestra (2007)

Choral
 Raerituaal (Town Council Custom) for mixed chorus, early music ensemble, electric guitar and chamber orchestra (1982–2004)
 Ante Finem Saeculi, Oratorio for soprano, tenor, bass, mixed chorus and orchestra (1985); Biblical text and words by Viivi Luik
 Lumen et Cantus, Mass for male chorus and orchestra (1989)
 Inquiétude du Fini for male chorus and chamber orchestra (1992); words by Tõnu Õnnepalu
 Psalmody for mixed chorus and early music ensemble (1993, 2005); Biblical text
 Requiem "In memoriam Peeter Lilje" for soprano, tenor, mixed chorus and chamber orchestra (1994)
 Rändaja õhtulaul (The Wanderer's Evening Song) for mixed chorus a cappella (2001)
 Meditatio for mixed chorus and saxophone quartet (2003)
 Salve Regina for male chorus and orchestra (2005)
 Igavik (Eternity) for male chorus and chamber orchestra (2006); words by Doris Kareva
 Questions... for countertenor, tenor, baritone, mixed choir and string orchestra (2007)
 Triglosson trishagion for mixed chorus a cappella (2008)
 Väike eestimaine laul (Little Estonian Song) for children's chorus (2009)
 Ärkamine (Awakening) for mixed choir and orchestra (2011)
 Missa brevis for mixed choir (2014)

Film scores
 Elu ilma Gabriella Ferrita (Life without Gabriella Ferri) (2008)

Discography
Symphony No. 9 "Mythos", Incantation of Tempest, Sow the Wind...; Estonian Festival Orchestra, Paavo Järvi
Symphony No. 8; Illumination; Whistles and Whispers from Uluru. Lawrence Power, viola; Genevieve Lacey, recorders; Tapiola Sinfonietta, Olari Elts
Peregrinus ecstaticus; Les poids de vies non vecues; Noesis. Christoffer Sundqvist, clarinet; Pekka Kuusisto, violin; Finnish Radio Symphony Orchestra, Hannu Lintu
Symphony No. 4 'magma'; inquiétude du fini; igavik (eternity); the path and the traces. Dame Evelyn Glennie, percussion; Estonian Philharmonic Chamber Choir ; Estonian National Male Choir; Estonian National Symphony Orchestra; Paavo Järvi
Architectonics VI; Passion; Illusion; Crystallisatio; Requiem. Kaja Urb, soprano; Tiit Kogermann, tenor; Tõnu Kaljuste/Estonian Philharmonic Chamber Choir, Tallinn Chamber Orchestra
Symphony No. 3; Concerto (cello); Lighthouse. David Geringas, cello; Dennis Russell Davies/Radio Symphonieorchester Wien
In the Memory of Clear Water. American Wind Symphony Orchestra
Insula deserta; Searching for Roots (Hommage à Sibelius); Zeitraum. Juha Kangas/Ostrobothnian Chamber Orchestra; Paavo Järvi/Royal Stockholm Philharmonic
Lighthouse. Juha Kangas/Ostrobothnian Chamber Orchestra (Finlandia: 3964-29718)
Spiel. Boris Björn Bagger, guitar; Martin Ostertag, cello
Symphony No. 2. Paul Mägi/USSR Ministry of Culture State Symphony Orchestra
Oratorium: Ante Finem Saeculi. Tõnu Kaljuste/Estonian Philharmonic Chamber Choir, Estonian Opera-Theatre Orchestra
Sonata. Kalle Randalu, piano
Architectonics I-VII; Spectrum II. NYYD Ensemble
Architectonics I-VII. Absolute Ensemble
Motus II. Cabaza Percussion Quartet
Spectrum I. Andres Uibo, organ
Spectrum II. Jüri Leiten, trumpet; Andres Uibo, organ; M. Metsamart, percussion
String Quartet. Tallinn Quartet
String Quartet. Duke Quartet
String Quartet No. 2 "Lost Prayers" (2012). Armida Quartett (Music for Strings)

References
Die Zeit interview (in German) by Burkhard Schäfer (21 Nov 2008), accessed 4 February 2010

External links
The Erkki-Sven Tüür Information Archive and Homepage, accessed 4 February 2010
Biographical website, accessed 4 February 2010

Fennica Gehrman's website

1959 births
Living people
People from Kärdla
20th-century classical composers
21st-century classical composers
Estonian Academy of Music and Theatre alumni
Male classical composers
20th-century Estonian composers
21st-century Estonian composers
20th-century male musicians
21st-century male musicians
Recipients of the Order of the White Star, 2nd Class